The Faculty of Social Sciences at Aalborg University is one of five faculties at AAU. The Faculty is headed by Dean Rasmus Antoft in collaboration with Associate Dean Søren Kristiansen. The Faculty of Social Science offers a wide range of educations within areas as social science, economy, politics, organization, law, sociology, criminology etc. The palette of opportunities is widely based, but common for all the educations is their focus on the world, which is surrounding us.

Departments 
 Department of Business and Management
 Department of Culture and Global Studies
 Department of Law
 Department of Learning and Philosophy
 Department of Political Science 
 Department of Sociology and Social Work

Bachelor Programs in English
 Economics and Business Administration

Master Programs in English
 China and International Relations
 Chinese Area Studies
 Development and International Relations
 European Studies
 Global Gender Studies
 Global Refugee Studies
 Latin American Studies
 Innovation, Knowledge and Economic Dynamics
 Innovation, Knowledge and Entrepreneurial Dynamics
 Innovation Management
 International Business Economics
 International Marketing

References

External links 
 The Faculty of Social Sciences website

Aalborg University